Gilson Machado Guimarães Neto, commonly known as Gilson Machado Neto, is a Brazilian entrepreneur, politician and was the Minister of Tourism under the government of Jair Bolsonaro.

He replaced the licensed federal deputy Marcelo Álvaro Antônio (PSL).

Personal life
Rural producer, entrepreneur, veterinary and leader of the band Forró da Brucelose, the minister was also President of Embratur. He is also the nephew of the deceased constituent parliamentary Gilson Machado Filho.

References

External links
 

|-

Year of birth missing (living people)
Living people
Politicians from Recife
Social Christian Party (Brazil) politicians
Ministers of Tourism of Brazil